Dale A. Dalziel is a former Canadian-American curler,  and a 1971 United States men's curling champion.

While residing in Canada, Dalziel qualified for his lone Brier in 1958, playing lead for the Tony Gutoski rink. Dalziel was 19 years old at the time, having just graduated from high school the previous year. It was his first season playing in the BC Men's Curling Championship. 

Dalziel moved from Victoria, British Columbia in 1959, settling in the United States. He won the United States Men's Curling Championship in 1971, after finishing the round robin with a 10–1 record. At the time of the 1971 Worlds, he was a school principal.

Teams

References

External links
 
 HOUSE CONCURRENT RESOLUTIONS "A concurrent resolution commending the Dale Dalziel Rink of Edmore ... Filed March 31, 1971" (page 1424, look at "Dale Dalziel")
 Past Champions – Victoria Curling Club
 Dale Dalziel - Curling Canada Stats Archive

Living people
American male curlers
Canadian male curlers
American curling champions
Canadian emigrants to the United States
1930s births
Curlers from Winnipeg
Curlers from Victoria, British Columbia